Cape Nelson is a cape on the north coast of Oro Province, Papua New Guinea. The cape was named by Captain John Moresby in 1874 commanding  after Lord Horatio Nelson.

of the most dangerous character, due to the unsurveyed areas and the numerous coral patches and shoals. The coral patches are steep-to and the sea seldom breaks on
them. The weather is often thick with passing squalls of rain, and anchorages are rare close to land. Between coral patches only a few miles apart, a sounding of several hundred meters may be obtained.

During World War II finding a route for supply by sea from Milne Bay to Cape Nelson through the Ward Hunt Strait past Cape Vogel and then through Collingwood Bay in support of the operation to take Buna was of critical importance as the Japanese control of open sea approaches to the north required ships to pass in the dangerous and almost uncharted inshore waters approaching Cape Nelson and it was only after difficult survey efforts that larger ships were able to supply that campaign.

See also
Operation Lilliput

References

References cited

Oro Province
Nelson